Swami Ramanand Teerth Marathwada University (SRTMU) was established in 1994 as a state public university of Maharashtra state. Named after Swami Ramanand Teerth, it is located at Latur Road Nanded in Maharashtra, India.

History

The university is intended to serve primarily the southern part of Marathwada, specifically the districts of Nanded, Latur, Parbhani, and Hingoli.

The university has received recognition from the UGC and the NAAC.

The university has directors for sports and physical education, and students welfare. There is a National Service Scheme (NSS) programme officer.

The university has Distance Education Department having PG Programme in Marathi, Hindi, English, Urdu, History, Political Sciences, Sociology, Economics and Public Administration at 59 affiliated Study centers at Nanded, Hingoli, Latur and Parbhani.

The university offers 27 postgraduate courses in Arts, Sciences, Computer, Commerce, Education, Business Administration, bachelor and master of Pharmacy. The university also offers eight M.Phil. courses.

Affiliated institutes and centers

Chairs
 B.R. Ambedkar
 Shri Guru Gobind Singhji

Districts Of jurisdiction
 Hingoli
 Latur
 Nanded
 Parbhani

The main campus at Nanded has the following schools:
School of Pharmacy
School of Commerce & Management Sciences
School of Computational Sciences
School of Social Sciences
School of Educational Sciences
School of Fine & Performing Arts
School of Media Studies
School of Language, Literature & Culture Studies
School of Mathematical Sciences
School of Earth Sciences
School of Chemical Sciences
School of Physical Sciences
School of Life Sciences
School of Interdisciplinary Studies
School of Library & Information Sciences

Sub-campus at Latur has the following schools:
Sub-Campus Latur_School of Technology
Sub-Campus Latur_School of Management
Sub-Campus Latur_School of Social Sciences
Sub-Campus Latur_School of Languages

University also has another Sub-Campus at Parbhani, a Tribal Development & Research Center at Kinwat, Dist: Nanded & a constituent college at Hingoli named New Model Degree College, Hingoli

See also 
Swami Ramanand Tirth

References
Swami Ramanand Teerth Marathwada University official website
Official Nanded City website

Universities in Maharashtra
Educational institutions established in 1994
Education in Nanded
1994 establishments in Maharashtra
Marathwada